The 2014 GCI Great Alaska Shootout was the 36th Great Alaska Shootout, the annual college basketball tournament in Anchorage, Alaska that features colleges from all over the United States. The event was scheduled from November 26 through November 29, 2014, with eight colleges and universities participating in the men's tournament and four universities participating in the women's tournament. Most of the games in the men's tournament were televised on the CBS Sports Network.

Brackets 
* – Denotes overtime period

Men's

Women's

References

External links
 Great Alaska Shootout official site 

Great Alaska Shootout
Great Alaska Shootout
Great Alaska Shootout
Great Alaska Shootout
Great Alaska Shootout